Kurukh or Kurux may refer to:
 Kurukh people, a people of eastern India and Bangladesh
 Kurukh language, their Dravidian language
 Dhangar language, the only Dravidian language of Nepal, which may also be referred to as Nepali Kurukh

Language and nationality disambiguation pages